Synaptonemal complex protein 3 is a protein that in humans is encoded by the SYCP3 gene. It is a component of the synaptonemal complex formed between homologous chromosomes during the prophase of meiosis.

Gene family 

SYCP3 is also known as COR1. It contains a conserved coiled-coil domain that is also found in the FAM9 (FAM9A, FAM9B) family of proteins, found on the human X chromosome.

Several SYCP3-like proteins are found on mice sex chromosomes. They are assigned names starting with Slx or Sly depending on the chromosome they are linked to. Slx/Slxl1 and Sly are neofunctionalized ones that have opposite effects on gene expression and epigenetic modifications, and each gene reduces the viability and mobility (via spindlin binding) of sperms containing the other sex chromosome, tilting the sex ratio to their own favor. Over time they are duplicated to balance out each other's effects.

References

Further reading

External links